Miraj Islamic School is an Islamic school in Tompkinsville, Staten Island, New York City. An Islamic school and center, it serves its students from pre-k through 12th grade.  The school was established in 1996.  It graduated its first class in 2011. The graduating class had 14 students.

References

External links
 Miraj Islamic School

Islamic schools in New York (state)
Educational institutions established in 1996
Private high schools in Staten Island
Private middle schools in Staten Island
Private elementary schools in Staten Island
1996 establishments in New York City
Tompkinsville, Staten Island